Leonard Albert "Len" Komoroski (born February 21, 1960) was Chief Executive Officer of Rock Entertainment Group, the umbrella entity of the teams and venues that are part of Cavaliers Chairman Dan Gilbert’s Rock Family of Companies. It includes the NBA Cleveland Cavaliers, the AHL Cleveland Monsters, the  NBA G League Cleveland Charge and Cavs Legion of the NBA 2K League; and the operation of Rocket Mortgage FieldHouse in Cleveland, Legion Lair Lit by TCP home of Cavs Legion in Cleveland, Cleveland Clinic Courts - the Cavaliers’ training and development center in Independence, Ohio. He also played a leadership role for business operations and business-related endeavors for Gilbert's development interests in downtown Cleveland and throughout the region.

In 2022, Komoroski stepped down as CEO after 19 years with the Cavaliers organization.

Komoroski serves on the board of directors of the Greater Cleveland Partnership, the Downtown Cleveland Alliance, Destination Cleveland and the Rock and Roll Hall of Fame. He is also a trustee for Cleveland Clinic's Hillcrest Hospital.

In 2019, Komoroski was inducted into the Pennsylvania Sports Hall of Fame.

Early life and career 
Born and raised in Pittsburgh, Pennsylvania, Komoroski earned a Bachelor of Arts degree from Duquesne University in 1982. While attending college, Komoroski was a four-year letterman of the tennis team, writer for The Duquesne Duke, and the President of Public Relations Society of America.

Komoroski was the COO for the Cleveland Lumberjacks (1994–96), played a leadership role in the startup of the Minnesota Timberwolves and development of Target Center as VP of Sales, and Director of Media/Community Relations for the Pittsburgh Spirit (1983–86), and assistant GM for the Minnesota Strikers.

Prior to joining the Cavaliers, Komoroski was the SVP of Business Operations for the Philadelphia Eagles from 1996 to 2003. Komoroski brought Eagles Television Network in-house, and played a leadership role in the development and commercialization of the NovaCare Complex and Lincoln Financial Field, including the brokering of the naming rights for each facility.

Rock Entertainment Group 
Komoroski played a leading role in establishing a long-term partnership extension with Bally Sports Ohio (formerly Fox Sports Ohio) in 2006, as well as in 2007, securing the entitlement of the Cavaliers new state-of-the-art player development center - Cleveland Clinic Courts in nearby Independence, OH.

Komoroski played a leading role in securing Cleveland as the host city for the 2016 Republican National Convention.

Komoroski was a key player in the acquisition of the Cleveland Monsters (AHL), Cleveland Charge (NBAGL) and Cavs Legion (NBA2K).

Together with key civic and community officials, Komoroski played a core leadership role in the public/private partnership agreement formed between the Cavs, Cuyahoga County and the City of Cleveland for the $185 million Rocket Mortgage FieldHouse Transformation, a major renovation project to transform the nearly 26-year-old venue. As part of the agreement, the Cavs extended their lease with their landlord, Gateway Economic Development Corporation, for seven additional years at the venue until 2034. The all-new Rocket Mortgage FieldHouse re-opened in late September 2019 for a full slate of games, concerts and events.  The Transformation project also secured Rocket Mortgage FieldHouse for the 2022 NBA All-Star Game.

See also 
List of National Basketball Association team presidents

References

Living people
National Basketball Association executives
Cleveland Cavaliers executives
National Football League executives
Philadelphia Eagles executives
1960 births
People from Pennsylvania
People from Pittsburgh
People from Allegheny County, Pennsylvania